Palo Congo is the first album by conguero Sabú Martínez, featuring Arsenio Rodríguez and his brothers Raúl and "Quique". It was recorded and released in 1957 through Blue Note Records.

Track listing

Personnel 
Louis "Sabú" Martínez - congas, bongos, vocals
Arsenio Rodríguez - congas, tres, guitar, vocals
Raúl "Caesar" Travieso - congas, vocals
Israel Moisés "Quique" Travieso - congas
Ray "Mosquito" Romero - congas
Evaristo Baró - double bass
Willie Capó - vocals
Sarah Baró - vocals

Technical
Alfred Lion - producer
Rudy Van Gelder - recording engineer

Reception

It was listed in the book 1001 Albums You Must Hear Before You Die.

References

External links
"Palo Congo". Discogs.com

Blue Note Records albums
1957 albums
Sabu Martinez albums